Euschistus is a genus of stink bugs in the family Pentatomidae. There are at least 20 described species in Euschistus.

Species
 Euschistus acuminatus Walker, 1867
 Euschistus biformis Stål, 1862
 Euschistus comptus Walker, 1868
 Euschistus conspersus Uhler, 1897 – consperse stink bug
 Euschistus crassus Dallas, 1851
 Euschistus crenator (Fabricius, 1794)
 Euschistus eggelstoni Rolston, 1974
 Euschistus egglestoni Rolston, 1974
 Euschistus ictericus (Linnaeus, 1763)
 Euschistus inflatus Van Duzee, 1903
 Euschistus integer Stål, 1872
 Euschistus latimarginatus Zimmer, 1910
 Euschistus obscurus (Palisot, 1817) – pale-lined stink bug
 Euschistus politus Uhler, 1897
 Euschistus quadrator Rolston, 1874
 Euschistus servus (Say, 1832) – brown stink bug
 Euschistus spurculus Stål, 1862
 Euschistus strenuus Stål, 1862
 Euschistus tristigmus (Say, 1832) – dusky stink bug
 Euschistus variolarius (Palisot, 1817) – one-spotted stink bug

References

 Thomas J. Henry, Richard C. Froeschner. (1988). Catalog of the Heteroptera, True Bugs of Canada and the Continental United States. Brill Academic Publishers.

Further reading

 Arnett, Ross H. (2000). American Insects: A Handbook of the Insects of America North of Mexico. CRC Press.

External links

 NCBI Taxonomy Browser, Euschistus

Pentatomidae genera
Pentatomini